Sedna ( Sanna, previously Sedna or Sidne) is the goddess of the sea and marine animals in Inuit mythology, also known as the Mother of the Sea or Mistress of the Sea. The story of Sedna, which is a creation myth, describes how she came to rule over Adlivun, the Inuit underworld.

Other names
Sedna is known as Arnakuagsak or Arnaqquassaaq in parts of Greenland. She's called Sassuma Arnaa ("Mother of the Deep") in West Greenlandic and Nerrivik ("Table", Inuktun) or Nuliajuk (District of Keewatin, Northwest Territories, Canada). She is sometimes known by other names by different Inuit groups such as Arnapkapfaaluk ("Big Bad Woman") of the Copper Inuit from the Coronation Gulf area and Takánakapsâluk or Takannaaluk (Igloolik). In Killiniq, Labrador, she was referred to as "Old-woman-who-lived-in-the-sea".

Myth

More than one version of the Sedna legend exists. Some legends have her as the daughter of a goddess named Isarrataitsoq, while others only mention her father. 

In one legend Sedna is a giant, the daughter of the creator-god Anguta, with a great hunger that causes her to attack her parents. Angered, Anguta takes her out to sea and throws her over the side of his kayak. As she clings to the sides, he chops off her fingers and she sinks to the underworld, becoming the ruler of the monsters of the deep. Her huge fingers become the seals, walruses, and whales hunted by the Inuit.

In another version of the legend, she is dissatisfied with men found for her by her father and so marries a dog. Her father is so angry at this that he throws her into the sea and, when she tries to climb back into the boat, he cuts off her fingers. Her fingers become the first seals and she becomes a mighty sea goddess.  When she is angered, the shaman travels to wash and comb her hair for her, after which she is placated and releases the animals to the hunters. In other versions, she's unable to comb her hair because she lacks fingers, so a shaman must brush it for her.

In the Netsilik region, the story states that Nuliayuk was a mistreated orphan. One day the people tried to get rid of her by attempting to drown her by chopping off her fingertips, which transformed into seals and walruses. Eventually, Nuliayuk marries a sculpin and lives in the sea controlling all sea mammals.

Other versions of the legend depict Sedna as a beautiful maiden who rejects marriage proposals from the hunters of her village. When an unknown hunter appears, Sedna's father agrees to give her to him as wife in return for fish. Sedna's father gives Sedna a sleeping potion and gives her to the hunter who takes her to a large nest on a cliff, revealing his true form: a great bird-spirit (variously described as a raven, a fulmar or a Kokksaut/petrel-spirit). She wakes surrounded by birds. Her father attempts to rescue her, but the bird-spirit becomes angry, causing a great storm. In desperation, Sedna's father throws her into the raging sea. Attempting to cling to the kayak, her hands freeze and her fingers fall off becoming the creatures of the sea. She falls to the bottom of the sea and grows a fishtail.

Sedna is kidnapped or deceived by a different bird creature in yet another version. Her father then leaves in his kayak to rescue her from the floating ice-island where she is imprisoned while the bird creature is away. The creature, enraged by her disappearance, calls to a spirit of the sea to help him. The sea spirit locates the kayak with the two humans aboard and creates huge waves to kill them. Her father throws Sedna overboard in the hope that this will appease the angry god. Sedna clings to the kayak but her father grabs a little ax and chops three of her fingers off before striking her on the head. The three fingers each become a different species of seal. The stroke to her head sends Sedna to the ocean floor where she resides, commanding the animals of the sea.

In one Baffin Island tradition, Sedna was in a kayak with her family when a storm started. Her parents thought she was to blame for the storm and threw her into the sea. She clung to the kayak, but her father cut her fingers off: first the tips, then the second knuckle, then the last knuckle. Her disembodied fingers turned into sea creatures. Sedna gained control over the animals. If humans angered her, she could stop the animals from coming to their hunting sites, thus causing famine.

The varying legends each give different rationales for Sedna's death. Yet, in each version, her father takes her to sea in his kayak, chopping off her fingers.  In each version she sinks to the bottom of the sea, worshiped by hunters who depend on her goodwill to supply food.  She is generally considered a vengeful goddess, and hunters must placate and pray to her to release the sea animals from the ocean depths for their hunt. At Killiniq, people threw worn-out harpoon-heads, broken knives, and morsels of meat and bone into the sea as offerings.

In astronomy
90377 Sedna, a trans-Neptunian object discovered by Michael Brown (Caltech), Chad Trujillo (Gemini Observatory) and David Rabinowitz (Yale University) on November 14, 2003, is named after her.

References

Sources
Andrews, Tamra. Dictionary of Nature Myths. Oxford University Press. 2000. .
Moss, John George. Echoing silence: essays on Arctic narrative. University of Ottawa Press. 1997. .
Osbourne, MaryJane.  Romancing the Goddess. University of Illinois Press. 1998. .
Tchana, Katrine.  Changing Woman and her sisters: stories of goddesses from around the world. Holiday House. 2006. .

Further reading
 Patton, Kimberley C. “‘The Great Woman Down There’: Sedna and Ritual Pollution in Inuit Seascapes”. In: The Sea Can Wash Away All Evils: Modern Marine Pollution and the Ancient Cathartic Ocean. Columbia University Press, 2007. pp. 79–96. http://www.jstor.org/stable/10.7312/patt13806.9.

Inuit goddesses
Sea and river goddesses
Hunting goddesses
Underworld goddesses
Animal goddesses